The Swedish National Final was held on 27 February 1982 in Gothenburg, Sweden.

Before Eurovision

Melodifestivalen 1982
Melodifestivalen 1982 was the selection for the 22nd song to represent Sweden at the Eurovision Song Contest. It was the 21st time that this system of picking a song had been used. 90 songs were submitted to SVT for the competition. The final was held in the Lisebergshallen in Gothenburg on 27 February 1982, presented by Fredrik Belfrage and was broadcast on TV1 but was not broadcast on radio.

The 10 songs were reduced to 5 finalists, which were then voted on by 9 juries split according to age ranges. Chips formed by Elisabeth Andreasson and Kikki Danielsson had both previously come 2nd in the Swedish 1981 National Final in a group called 'Sweet 'n' Chips'. Kikki Danielsson had previously came joint 1st in the Swedish 1978 National Final but lost out on a tie-break and previously came 4th in the group Chips in 1980.

Voting

At Eurovision
Sweden performed 9th on the evening of the contest, following Cyprus and preceding Austria. They finished 8th with 67 points.

Voting

References

External links
 TV broadcastings at SVT's open archive
 Eurovision Song Contest : Details : Sweden 1982 - ESC-History.com
 Swedish National Final 1982 - Geocities.com

1982
Countries in the Eurovision Song Contest 1982
1982
Eurovision
Eurovision